The Tragedy of Whispering Creek is a 1914 American silent short Western film directed by Allan Dwan and featuring Murdock MacQuarrie, Pauline Bush, and Lon Chaney. Chaney expert Jon Mirsalis says Chaney also wrote the screenplay, based on a story by Elliott J. Clawson, but the Blake book says the film's director Allan Dwan wrote the screenplay himself. A print exists in the Deutsche Kinemathek film archive, making it Chaney's earliest surviving moving picture. A still exists which shows Chaney in his role as "The Greaser".

Plot
A vile bully known as The Greaser (Lon Chaney) is terrorizing the young ladies in a mining town called Whispering Creek. When he tries to accost a young teenage orphan girl, her fiance Bashful Bill gives the Mexican a sound beating. Soon after, a handsome stranger (Murdock MacQuarrie) rides into town and saves the same girl from the Greaser again. Falling in love with her himself, he tries to romance the young lady, unaware that she is engaged to Bashful Bill.

When he learns they are set to be wed, he decides to not interfere in their happiness. The stranger leaves town, but on the way out, he spots the Greaser lying in ambush, plotting to kill Bashful Bill and the girl. The stranger and the Greaser shoot it out, and wind up killing each other in the ensuing gunfight, saving Bill's and the girl's life in the process.

Cast
 Murdock MacQuarrie as The Stranger
 Pauline Bush as The Orphan
 William C. Dowlan as Bashful Bill
 Lon Chaney as The Greaser
 George Cooper as The Kid
 Mary Ruby as The Kid's Sweetheart
 Doc Crane as Prospector
 William Lloyd as Prospector
 John Burton as Prospector

Reception
The Moving Picture World wrote "The story is very uncertain in development, but has an unusually pleasing setting throughout the entire production. The backgrounds were selected with a good eye to artistic effects. The story is vague in places and the photography not quite up to standard. The closing scenes are of a tragical nature."

Universal Weekly opined "And then there is Mr. Chaney in the role of the Greaser. Mr. Chaney has used his own ideas in working out the character, a pervert, in this play and what he has given us is startling to an unusual degree. True, he paints a horrible picture for us...one that is apt to cause a feeling of revulsion. But that is as it should be. In fact, Mr. Chaney has created a new character -- one that will live long -- that will be copied as a newer standard for others."

References

External links
 

1914 films
1914 short films
1914 Western (genre) films
American silent short films
American black-and-white films
Films directed by Allan Dwan
Silent American Western (genre) films
Universal Pictures short films
1910s American films